Clematis cirrhosa is a species of flowering plant in the family Ranunculaceae, native to the Mediterranean. It includes the 'Freckles', 'Wisley Cream' and 'Jingle Bells' cultivars, with 'Freckles' and 'Wisley Cream' having gained the Royal Horticultural Society's Award of Garden Merit.

It is also one of 8 subdivisions in the Thorncroft Clematis catalogue, published in 2000.

References 

cirrhosa
Plants described in 1753
Taxa named by Carl Linnaeus
Flora of Malta